Plum is an unincorporated community in Fayette County, Texas, United States. Plum has a post office with the ZIP code 78952.

Geography
Plum is on State Highway 71 and the Missouri, Kansas and Texas Railroad, eight miles west of La Grange in Fayette County. F. Lotto's book Fayette County, Her History and Her People, claims that the property surrounding Plum is prairie and postoak.

History
The area was initially settled by families from Tennessee on lands granted to Andrew Castleman in 1828 and John Cooke in 1831 and acquired the name Plum Grove. Plum Grove is the second oldest established community in Fayette County. The Hopewell (now Plum) Baptist Church was the first Baptist church in Texas established west of the Colorado River and the first in Texas to hold an ordination service and administer the ordinance of baptism. On July 8, 1861, the Plum Grove Rifles was formed under the command of Capt. Thomas C. Moore. Apparently the unit was designed for training, because its members were subsequently drafted or volunteered to join other regular units. In 1880 a post office was established, and by 1900 the community had two churches, two stores, two cotton gins, two blacksmith shops, a saloon, and a physician. By 1950 it had an estimated population of 280 and seven businesses. By the 1980s the population had dropped to ninety-five and the number of businesses to two; the town retained its post office. The discovery of oil in the Austin Chalk formation during the late 1970s and early 1980s boosted the local economy. Through 2000 the population was still ninety-five.

References

External links
 PLUM, TX Handbook of Texas Online.

Unincorporated communities in Fayette County, Texas
Unincorporated communities in Texas